The Marion County Courthouse is the seat of government for Marion County, Ohio, United States. The Marion County Courthouse was built during 1884–1886.

Ten niches are decorated with sandstone heads of various figures. Four of them are meant to depict various races—a white woman, an African man, an Asian man, and an American Indian man. Other heads include two settler girls and a settler woman, plus a head similar to depictions of William Shakespeare.

In the 1970s, county officials announced a plan to perform extensive changes the building's interior, which had previously experienced few modifications since construction. The Marion County Historical Society protested the plans and aroused substantial public displeasure; preparations were made for a referendum to repeal the plans, and enough local residents signed a ballot petition that it would have qualified for a vote, but no vote was held because Ohio law does not permit referendums of the sort. Numerous original wood carvings and paintings were destroyed, ceilings were dropped, and aluminum doors installed. County officials sought to mollify local ire by retaining the building's exterior, including restoring the statue of Justice atop the tower.

References

External links

Courthouses on the National Register of Historic Places in Ohio
Buildings and structures in Marion, Ohio
National Register of Historic Places in Marion County, Ohio
County courthouses in Ohio
Government buildings completed in 1886
Clock towers in Ohio